Alex Adomako-Mensah (born 5 November 1962) is a Ghanaian male politician and Member of Parliament for Sekyere Afram Plains Constituency in the Ashanti Region, Ghana.

Early life 
He was born on 5 November 1962 and hails from Kumawu in the Ashanti Region.

Education 
Alex Adomako-Mensah earned his MBA in (UK) from the University of Leicester, in 2001. He became an Associate Member (ACIM) of the  Chartered Institute of Marketing, UK in 2003 and was honored a Member of the Chartered Management Institute (MCMI) by Chartered Institute of Marketing, UK in 2006.

Political life 
He is a member of the National Democratic Congress who was voted as part of the MPs elected in the Ghanaian parliamentary election in 2016 to represent Sekyere Afram plains. He won the seat with 5,664 votes out of the 9,275 valid votes cast generating 60.85% of the total votes cast.

Committees 
He is a member of the Employment, Social Welfare and State Enterprises Committee and also a member of the Finance Committee.

Robbery attack 
On August 14, 2017, the MP was attacked by some unidentified armed robbers on his way from Kumasi heading towards Kumawu in the evening.

Personal life 
He is a Christian and married (with five children).

References 

Living people
1962 births
Ghanaian bankers
People from Ashanti Region
National Democratic Congress (Ghana) politicians
Ghanaian MPs 2009–2013
Ghanaian MPs 2013–2017
Ghanaian MPs 2017–2021
Alumni of the University of Leicester
Ghanaian MPs 2021–2025